The Saints Cyril and Methodius University in Skopje is the oldest and largest public university in North Macedonia. It is named after the Byzantine Christian theologians and missionaries Cyril and Methodius. As of 2018–19 school year, a total of 25,220 students are enrolled at the university. Furthermore, the teaching and research staff number 2,390 people; this is further supported by over 300 members in the university's institutions.

The primary language of instruction is Macedonian, but there are a number of courses which are carried out in English, German, French, Italian and Albanian.

History

During the World War II in Yugoslav Macedonia the Bulgarian occupation authorities established in 1943, in Skopje, the first institute of higher education – the Tsar Boris III University. Due to the withdrawal of the Bulgarian army in the Autumn of 1944, the University stopped its educational activity. However, after the establishment of the Socialist Republic of Macedonia, on the third session of the Presidium of the Antifascist Council of the National Liberation of Macedonia, held in April 1945, one of the items on the agenda was the question of opening a Macedonian university to replace the Bulgarian one. At the end of 1946, the concept of a university began to be realized and the official opening ceremony for the Faculty of Philosophy, the cornerstone of the University of Skopje, took place on 29 November of that year. This marked the beginning of a Macedonian state university. The first faculty consisted of the Department of History and Philology and the Department of Mathematics and Natural Science, while the Medical Faculty and the Faculty of Agriculture and Forestry were added in 1947. Fifty-eight students enrolled during the first academic year of 1946–1947; in the next year this number grew to 907. The development of higher education in North Macedonia was characterized by rapid growth, and several other faculties were added in the following years. Parallel to the education activities in the existing faculties, scholarly research was undertaken with the development of independent institutes of research. Thus, the Institute of National History was founded in 1948, followed by Institute of Folklore in 1949, and the Institute of Economics in 1952. Today, there are 10 research institutes affiliated with the University of Skopje.

After the great 1963 Skopje earthquake, which destroyed most of the city of Skopje, the university was leveled and some of the most modern laboratories in Yugoslavia were destroyed. By this time the University of Skopje was the third largest in Yugoslavia. It was quickly rebuilt on the premises of a much larger and modern urban campus. At the request of Yugoslav authorities, scientists from UNESCO's Department of Natural Sciences were sent to meet with the university's scientists to develop plans for the rehabilitation of the university's science laboratories. As a result, a large donation of equipment for science teaching and research was gathered from around the world through UNESCO's international programme of aid to Skopje.

At present, the University of Skopje is carried out in the spirit of the 1991 Constitution of the Republic of North Macedonia, which incorporated the social, economic and political changes that had taken place after North Macedonia proclaimed its independence from the Former Yugoslav Federate State. On 3 August 2000 the Parliament of the Republic of North Macedonia brought the new Law on Higher Education which adopted the overall European standards of higher education. The management organs of the university are the University Senate, consisting of two staff members from each faculty and scientific research institutes, five appointed members by the government of the Republic of North Macedonia and five students delegated from the Student Organization; the University Board, consisting of the rector, the vice-rectors, the secretary general, the deans of the faculties, the directors of the scientific-research institutes and one student representative; and the rector. The university represents a functional community of 25 faculties and 10 research institutes.

Departments and faculties

The university is divided into 23 faculties and 10 research institutes:

Faculties
 Faculty of Philosophy
Founded in 1946
12 undergraduate study programmes
17 postgraduate study programmes
 "Blaže Koneski" Faculty of Philology 
Founded in 1946
11 undergraduate study programmes
13 postgraduate study programmes
 Faculty of Natural Sciences and Mathematics
Founded in 1946
24 undergraduate study programmes
31 postgraduate study programmes
 Faculty of Agricultural Sciences and Food
Founded in 1947
10 undergraduate study programmes
24 postgraduate study programmes
 Faculty of Forestry
Founded in 1947
4 undergraduate study programmes
17 postgraduate study programmes
 Medical Faculty
Founded in 1947
3 undergraduate study programmes
24 postgraduate study programmes
 "St. Clement of Ohrid" Faculty of Pedagogy
Founded in 1947
6 undergraduate study programmes
 Faculty of Architecture
Founded in 1949
1 undergraduate study programme
4 postgraduate study programmes
 Faculty of Civil Engineering
Founded in 1949
5 undergraduate study programmes
4 postgraduate study programmes
 Faculty of Economics
Founded in 1950
7 undergraduate study programmes
10 postgraduate study programmes
 "Iustinianus Primus" Faculty of Law 
Founded in 1951
3 undergraduate study programmes
6 postgraduate study programmes
 Faculty of Mechanical Engineering
Founded in 1959
9 undergraduate study programmes
6 postgraduate study programmes
 Faculty of Electrical Engineering and Information Technology
Founded in 1959
8 undergraduate study programmes
9 postgraduate study programmes
 Faculty of Technology and Metallurgy
Founded in 1959
9 undergraduate study programmes
16 postgraduate study programmes
 Faculty of Stomatology
Founded in 1959
3 undergraduate study programmes
7 postgraduate study programmes
 Faculty of Music
Founded in 1966
27 undergraduate study programmes
36 postgraduate study programmes
 Faculty of Dramatic Arts
Founded in 1969
7 undergraduate study programmes
13 postgraduate study programmes
 Faculty of Physical Education
Founded in 1977
2 undergraduate study programmes
2 postgraduate study programmes
 Faculty of Pharmacy
Founded in 1977
2 undergraduate study programme
9 postgraduate study programmes
 Faculty of Fine Arts
Founded in 1980
4 undergraduate study programmes
3 postgraduate study programmes
 Faculty of Veterinary Medicine
Founded in 1991
1 undergraduate study programme
5 postgraduate study programmes
 Faculty of Design and Technologies of Furniture and Interior
Founded in 2010
2 undergraduate study programmes
8 postgraduate study programmes
 Faculty of Computer Science and Computer Engineering
Founded in 2010 by uniting of institutes (institutes founded 1982) 
8 undergraduate study programmes
16 postgraduate study programmes

Research Institutes
 Institute of Agriculture
Founded in 1923
 Institute of National History
Founded in 1948
 "Marko Cepenkov" Institute of Folklore
Founded in 1950
 Institute of Cattle Breeding
Founded in 1952
 Institute of Economics
Founded in 1952
 "Krste Misirkov Institute of the Macedonian Language"
Founded in 1953
 Institute of Sociological, Political, and Juridical Research 
Founded in 1965
 Institute of Earthquake and Seismology Engineering
Founded in 1965
 "St. Clement of Ohrid" Faculty of Theology
Founded in 1977
 Institute of Macedonian Literature
Founded in 1998

Mission
The Ss. Cyril and Methodius University's mission is to be an:

 autonomous, scientific and higher educational university that provides teaching, scholar and applicative activities in technical, natural sciences and mathematics, bio-technical, artistic, medical and social sciences;
 university devoted to the cherishing as well as the international affirmation of the traditional features and values of the Macedonian people such as: the Macedonian language, the history, the literature and culture of the Macedonian people and also the cultural values of the ethnic communities in the Republic of North Macedonia;
 university open for all students on the basis of equality and their results regardless of their ideological, political, cultural and social background;
 university that concords its academic offer to the needs of its social surrounding and has a continuously dynamic relationship with it;
 university that creates stimulative surrounding for its employees providing them a progress of their abilities in order to accomplish its mission;
 university that develops long-life and continuous education;
 university determined to achieve the European norms and standards in all spheres of its activities.

Alumni

Nina Angelovska – Finance minister
Džordže Arsov – Mayor of Kisela Voda
Ljube Boškoski – Former Minister of Internal Affairs of North Macedonia
Vlado Bučkovski – Former Prime Minister of North Macedonia
Branko Crvenkovski – 3rd President of North Macedonia
Živko Čingo – Writer
Georgi Efremov – Macedonian Academician and scientist at Macedonian Academy of Sciences and Arts in the field of Genetic Engineering and Biotechnology
Fatmir Besimi – Minister of Economy
Nikola Dimitrov – former Deputy Minister of Foreign Affairs and Ambassador to the United States
Elizabeta Dimitrova – art historian
Igor Durlovski – opera singer
Lazar Elenovski – former Minister of Defense
Taki Fiti – former Minister of Finance
Ljubomir Frčkoski – author of the Constitution of North Macedonia
Ljubčo Georgievski – former Prime Minister of North Macedonia
Sofija Grandakovska, author in the field of comparative literature studies and interdisciplinary studies in Holocaust, Jewish history, literature and culture
Maja Hill – Artist, formerly Maja Dzartovska 
Gjorge Ivanov – President of North Macedonia and Supreme Commander-in-Chief of Macedonian Army
Zoran Jolevski – Ambassador to the United States and Negotiator for the Macedonia naming dispute
Sashko Kedev – former Presidential Candidate
Gabriela Konevska-Trajkovska – Deputy Prime Minister in charge of European Integration
Trifun Kostovski – businessman and former Mayor of Skopje
Tamara Kotevska - Filmmaker, best known for the documentary Honeyland which won three awards at the 2019 Sundance Film Festival and received two nominations at the 92nd Academy Awards
Jagnula Kunovska – Member of Parliament
Denko Maleski - intellectual, diplomat, and professor
Sehadete Mekuli – gynecologist
Antonio Milošoski – Minister of Foreign Affairs
Zan Mitrev - General Manager of the Zan Mitrev Clinic
Tito Petkovski – Member of Parliament
Filip Petrovski – former Member of Parliament and Director of the City Library
Petar Popovski – Full professor at Aalborg University and IEEE fellow
Nikola Ristanovski - actor
Luan Starova – writer and scholar
Zoran Stavrevski – Deputy Prime Minister and Minister of Finances of North Macedonia
General Miroslav Stojanovski – Chief of General Staff of North Macedonia
Boris Trajkovski – 2nd President of North Macedonia
Simon Trpčeski - World-renowned classical pianist
Vasil Tupurkovski – Macedonian politician.

See also

 Balkan Universities Network
 Lists of universities and colleges
 Macedonian Journal of Medical Sciences
 Macedonian Journal of Chemistry and Chemical Engineering

References

External links
 

 
1946 establishments in Yugoslavia
Education in Skopje
Law schools in Yugoslavia